Satgur Air Transport was an airline based at Roberts International Airport, near  Monrovia, Liberia.  The airline, also called Satqar Air, began operations in 2004.

Operations
Satgur operated Antonov AN-24s to Dakar, Abidjan, and Conakry. The airline was criticized for failing to meet basic safety requirements in 2004, but it implied that its aircraft was airworthy by responding that it "will never put the lives of passengers at risk".

In 2006 its operating certificate was revoked and it was added to the European Union list of banned air carriers.

Code data

IATA Code: 2S
ICAO Code: TGR
Callsign: SATGURAIR

See also		
 List of defunct airlines of Liberia

References

Defunct airlines of Liberia
Airlines established in 2004
2004 establishments in Liberia
Airlines disestablished in 2006
2006 disestablishments in Africa